Niederdollendorf railway station is a station on the East Rhine Railway in the Königswinter suburb of Niederdollendorf in the Rhein-Sieg-Kreis district of North Rhine-Westphalia, Germany. It is a protected as a monument. The station was opened on 11 July 1870 as part of the extension of the East Rhine Railway from Neuwied to Oberkassel.

At its core is the entrance building, which is a two-story brick building built in 1898. To its north and south it is bordered by single-storey extensions. The station restaurant is in the southern extension. The northern extension was built later to house rail services. The upper floor of the main building was designed to accommodate rail service apartments. The station has a gabled central avant-corps and the windows and the portals have rounded tops. The facades are decorated with cornices attached to the gable and terracotta friezes. The platform canopies have cast iron columns.

About 50 metres to the north of the station building is an operations building, which was built also of brick in 1910 for the handling of freight. The hip roof of the building is provided with dormers. Its knee wall is made of timber. The handling of freight at Niederdollendorf station was gradually abandoned in the 1940s and 1950s. It had been the terminus of the narrow-gauge Heisterbach Valley Railway, which closed in 1942.

The station is classified by Deutsche Bahn as a category 5 station. Oberdollendorf Stadtbahn station on the Siebengebirge Railway (part of the Bonn Stadtbahn) is about 200 metres to the east and, like Niederdollendorf station, it is on Heisterbacher Straße, enabling quick transfers.

The station is served hourly by Regional-Express service RE 8 (Rhein-Erft-Express) and Regionalbahn service RB 27 (Rhein-Erft-Bahn), which complement each another to provide an approximate half-hourly service.

Notes

Railway stations in North Rhine-Westphalia
Railway stations in Germany opened in 1870
Buildings and structures in Rhein-Sieg-Kreis